Delburne  is a village in the central region of Alberta, Canada that is east of Red Deer.

Named for Delia Mewburn, sister of pioneer physician F.H. Mewburn.  Delburne is a quaint agricultural community located in the centre of Alberta's scenic Parkland region.  The village is accentuated by its tree lined streets and murals depicting historical events on the sides of buildings. Downtown Delburne maintains a historical charm.

Delburne amenities include a nine-hole golf and country club, a campground, several coffee shops/restaurants, and sporting facilities such as a curling rink, hockey rink, baseball diamond and an equestrian centre.  The village also has a school, library, bank/credit union, post office, laundromat, grocery stores, gas station and other basic services.

Delburne offers visitors a glance into its past at the Anthony Henday Museum, which offers guided tours.

Demographics 

In the 2016 Census of Population conducted by Statistics Canada, the Village of Delburne recorded a population of 892 living in 380 of its 394 total private dwellings, a  change from its 2011 population of 830.

See also 
List of communities in Alberta
List of villages in Alberta

References

External links 

1913 establishments in Alberta
Villages in Alberta